is a Japanese manga artist. She made her debut with Aka–chan to Tenshi in 1989. She is best known for Kingyo Used Books (2004–2020), serialized in Shogakukan's Monthly Ikki magazine.
Yoshizaki has illustrated manga written by Takashi Nagasaki, who also works under the pen names Toshusai Garaku and Richard Woo, several times since Telekinesis Yamate TV Kinema Shitsu (2004–2007). They first reunited for the female detective manga Deka Girl, which ran in Kodansha's Kiss Plus from 2008 to August 2011. The two then serialized the science fiction detective series Usagi Tantei Monogatari (2012–2013) for Kodansha's Kiss. Yoshizaki and Woo created Abracadabra: Ryōki Hanzai Tokusōshitsu in Big Comic Original Zōkan from 2014 to 2020. It won the first Saito Takao Award in 2018. In 2022, the two began the suspense manga Minzoku Gakusha Akasaka Yaichirō no Jiken-bo in the October issue of Kodansha's Monthly Afternoon, which was released on August 24, 2022.

Selected works 
2000–2002 Kingyoya Koshoten Suitouchō
2001– The Paradise on the Earth
2004–2020 Kingyo Used Books
2004–2007 Telekinesis Yamate TV Kinema Shitsu, written by Toshusai Garaku
2008– Ugokashiya
2008–2011 Deka Girl, written by Takashi Nagasaki
2012–2013 Usagi Tantei Monogatari, written by Takashi Nagasaki
2014–2020 Abracadabra: Ryōki Hanzai Tokusōshitsu, written by Richard Woo
2022–present Minzoku Gakusha Akasaka Yaichirō no Jiken-bo, written by Richard Woo

References

External links
 芳崎せいむ公式サイト SAY BY SEIMU  
 

Living people
Manga artists from Kanagawa Prefecture
Year of birth missing (living people)